The Bristol 39 is an American sailboat that was designed by Ted Hood as a racer-cruiser and first built in 1966.

Production
The Bristol 39 was produced 1966-1970 and was replaced in production by the Bristol 40, which was built from  1970–1986. Both are related designs, from the same hull molds. They have same the same principle dimensions, but have different lengths overall,  versus .

The Bristol 39 was built by Bristol Yachts in Bristol, Rhode Island, United States. The company produced 58 examples of the type, before production shifted to the Bristol 40.

Design
The Bristol 39 is a recreational keelboat, built predominantly of fiberglass, with wood trim. It has a masthead sloop rig. It features a spooned raked stem, a raised counter reverse transom, a keel-mounted rudder controlled by a wheel and a fixed modified long keel, with a cutaway forefoot. A stub keel and centerboard was optional. It displaces  and carries  of lead ballast.

The boat is fitted with a Perkins Engines 4-107 diesel engine for docking and maneuvering.

Operational history
Bob Pingel, writing in Sailing Magazine in 2011 noted, "I recently conducted one of my cruising boat buyer's workshops and one of the attendees, Mark Mesone, was determined to buy a used Bristol 39 or 40 ... Mesone had concluded that the Bristol was the boat for him because it was beautiful, well built, large enough to live aboard with style, and when compared to more modern boats, quite affordable. He also loved the idea of owning a "classic." I couldn't find fault with any of his arguments."

See also
List of sailing boat types

Related development
Bristol 40

Similar sailboats
Baltic 40
Endeavour 40
Islander 40
Nordic 40

References

Keelboats
1960s sailboat type designs
Sailing yachts
Sailboat types built by Bristol Yachts
Sailboat type designs by Ted Hood